AS Matavai is a Tahitian football club that played in the Championnat d'Honneur, the top level of football in Tahiti, in 2001–02.

References

Football clubs in Tahiti
Football clubs in French Polynesia